Muhammad I ar-Rashid (1710 – 12 February 1759) was the third leader of the Husainid Dynasty and the ruler of Tunisia from 1756 until his death.

See also
Rejeb Khaznadar

18th-century people from the Ottoman Empire
18th-century Tunisian people
1710 births
1759 deaths
Beys of Tunis
18th-century rulers in Africa
Tunisian royalty